Tunku Hajah Azizah Aminah Maimunah Iskandariah binti Almarhum Al-Mutawakkil Alallah Sultan Iskandar Al-Haj (Jawi: تونكو حاجة عزيزة أمينة ميمونة إسكندرية بنت المرحوم المتوكل على ﷲ سلطان إسكندر الحاج; born 5 August 1960) is the Raja Permaisuri Agong (Supreme Queen consort) of Malaysia and the Tengku Ampuan (Queen consort) of Pahang.

Tengku Ampuan is a title reserved for the consort and first wife of the current ruler or sultan, of noble birth, as enshrined in the Pahang State Constitution. She is the consort of Al-Sultan Abdullah Al-Haj of Pahang. She is serving as Raja Permaisuri Agong of Malaysia from 2019, during her husband's reign as Yang di-Pertuan Agong (the Supreme Ruler) of Malaysia.

The installation on 30 July 2019 has yet another historical significance because Al-Sultan Abdullah and the Raja Permaisuri Agong, Tunku Azizah Aminah Maimunah Iskandariah, are the children of sultans who have been elected as the Yang di-Pertuan Agong.

Background 
Tunku Azizah Aminah Maimunah Iskandariah is the third daughter and princess of the late Sultan of Johor Iskandar of Johor and his first wife Enche Besar Hajah Khalsom binti Abdullah. Her brother is the current Sultan of Johor, Ibrahim Ismail of Johor. She received her early education at Sekolah Taman Kanak-Kanak Tunku Ampuan Mariam Johor Bahru from 1962 to 1966, Sekolah Perempuan Rendah Sultan Ibrahim, Johor Bahru and continued her secondary education in Sekolah Tun Fatimah, Johor Bahru from 1973 to 1979. From 1980 to 1986, she studied at Maktab
Perguruan Temenggong Ibrahim, Johor Bahru and  Political Science and Sociology at National University of Singapore (NUS).

Family 

She married at the Sultan Abu Bakar State Mosque, Johor Bahru, 6 March 1986 to the fourth child of Sultan Ahmad Shah of Pahang with his first wife, Tengku Ampuan Afzan, Al-Sultan Abdullah. She has been created Tengku Puan in addition to her Johor title of Paduka Puteri in 1986. She is one of the sisters of the current Sultan Johor, Sultan Ibrahim Ismail. They have four sons and two daughters together. She is the first wife of Abdullah, his second wife is the actress Julia Rais.

Sons 
 late His Highness Tengku Ahmad Iskandar Shah, born and died on 
 His Royal Highness Tengku Hassanal Ibrahim Alam Shah, the Tengku Mahkota (Crown Prince) and Regent of Pahang (shortly Tengku Hassanal) born at Tengku Ampuan Afzan Hospital, Kuantan on 
 His Highness Tengku Muhammad Iskandar Riayatuddin Shah, the Tengku Arif Bendahara (shortly Tengku Muhammad) born on  

Daughters 
 Her Highness Tengku Puteri Jihan Azizah Athiyatullah, the Tengku Puteri Raja (shortly Tengku Jihan), born on

Patronages 

 Co-founder and Patron of Royal Pahang Weave Foundation (Yayasan Tenun Pahang Diraja)
 Royal Patron of Prison Arts and Crafts Malaysia
 Constitutional Head of the International Islamic University Malaysia (IIUM)
 Chancellor of the Berjaya University College
 Chancellor of the University College of Yayasan Pahang (UCYP) 
 Patron of the Girl Guides Association of Malaysia. 
 President of the Girl Guides Association of Pahang.
 President of the Pahang Women's Institute (WI).
 Founder & Patron of the Tunku Azizah Fertility Foundation (TAFF).

Awards and recognitions 

She has been awarded :

Honours of Pahang 
  : 
  Member 1st class of the Family Order of the Crown of Indra of Pahang (DK I)
  Grand Knight of the Order of Sultan Ahmad Shah of Pahang (SSAP)
  Grand Knight of the Order of the Crown of Pahang (SIMP)

National and state honours 
  : 
  Recipient of the Order of the Crown of the Realm (DMN, 11 July 2019)
  : 
  Member First Class of the Royal Family Order of Johor (DK I)
  Knight Grand Commander of the Order of the Crown of Johor (SPMJ)

Foreign honours 
  :
  Senior (Laila Utama) of the Most Esteemed Family Order of Laila Utama (DK)

Places named after her

Several places were named after her, including:

 Hospital Tunku Azizah in Kuala Lumpur
 SK Tunku Azizah, a primary school in Kuantan, Pahang

Ancestry

References 

1960 births
Living people
Royal House of Pahang
Malaysian people of Malay descent
Malaysian Muslims
Pahang royal consorts
Malaysian royal consorts
First Classes of the Royal Family Order of Johor
Knights Grand Commander of the Order of the Crown of Johor
Malaysian queens consort
Recipients of the Order of the Crown of the Realm
First Classes of the Family Order of the Crown of Indra of Pahang
Daughters of monarchs